Nagshead SSSI is a  biological Site of Special Scientific Interest located within RSPB Nagshead, near Parkend, in the Forest of Dean, Gloucestershire.

It was notified in 1972 and is listed in the 'Forest of Dean Local Plan Review' as a Key Wildlife Site.

The SSSI consists of two units of assessment by Natural England and occupies a relatively small area on the eastern side of the much larger  nature reserve, all of which is jointly managed by the RSPB and Forestry England.

History
The woodland in the Forest of Dean has been managed for timber for a significant time.  As a consequence there is a variety of woodland types as a result of the woodland management. The central area of woodland is in the Coal Measures and this area supports oak with restricted ground flora. This is an acidic area.  Around it are the limestone and Old Red Sandstone rocks.  These provide soils which are more fertile and a richer ground flora.

The Nagshead site is one of three sites in the Forest of Dean which are of national nature conservation importance.  It is an excellent example of broad-leaved woodland and is of major ornithological importance. The oldest part of the site was planted in 1814 and includes pedunculate oak and sessile oak.

Understorey
The ground flora of the understorey varies dependent upon whether the woodland is grazed by sheep. A dense shrub layer which is dominated by holly and rowan occurs in the ungrazed areas. Grazed areas are more open. Herb layers consists of bramble, bracken, softgrass and tufted hair grass. wood sorrel and bluebell are locally abundant.

Ponds and streams
The Cannop Brook runs within the site and there are semi-natural area of woodland (mostly alder). The diversity of the habitat is enhanced by small ponds and streams and there are rarer plants reported such as heath spotted orchid and broad-leaved helleborine.

Birdlife
This is an area which is rich in bird life and there are established populations of breeding pied flycatcher, wood warbler and common redstart. There has been long established research into the breeding biology of various birds at Nagshead and there is a nestbox scheme managed by the RSPB.

Invertebrates
Butterflies are attracted by the open rides and recordings including white admiral, pearl-bordered fritillary and purple hairstreak. The Cannop Brook supports a good range of woodland invertebrates.

Conservation
The unit reports for 2009 indicate the need for a watching brief on the presence of sweet chestnut and sycamore.  Implications of the lack of grazing are noted and how this may affect the woodland structure necessary for some breeding birds.

References

SSSI Source
 Natural England SSSI information on the citation
 Natural England SSSI information on the Nagshead units

External links 
Royal Society for the Protection of Birds (RSPB)
Forestry Commission
Natural England (SSSI information)

Sites of Special Scientific Interest in Gloucestershire
Sites of Special Scientific Interest notified in 1972
Nature reserves in Gloucestershire
Forest of Dean
Royal Society for the Protection of Birds reserves in England